The New York Cosmos (simply the Cosmos in 1977–1978) were an American professional soccer club based in New York City and its suburbs. The team played home games in three stadiums around New York, including Yankee Stadium in the Bronx, before moving in 1977 to Giants Stadium in nearby East Rutherford, New Jersey, where it remained for the rest of its history. 

Founded in December 1970, the team competed in the North American Soccer League (NASL) until 1984 and was the strongest franchise in that league, both competitively and financially – based largely around its backing by Warner Communications President Steve Ross, which enabled it to sign internationally famous stars such as the Brazilian forward Pelé, Italian striker Giorgio Chinaglia and the West German sweeper Franz Beckenbauer. The acquisition of these foreign players, particularly Pelé, made the Cosmos into what journalist Gavin Newsham called "the most glamorous team in world football", and contributed to the development of soccer across the United States, a country where it had previously been largely ignored.

As the Cosmos declined following Pelé's retirement, so did the NASL. Attendances fell, the league's television deal was lost, and it finally folded in 1985 after playing its last season in 1984. The Cosmos attempted to continue operations in the Major Indoor Soccer League, but attendances were so low that the club withdrew without completing a season. The team attempted an independent schedule in 1985, but also canceled that because of low attendance. The Cosmos folded, though the team's youth camps continued to operate under the Cosmos name and label, run by the franchise's former general manager, G. Peppe Pinton.

The Cosmos name remained very well known, even after it stopped competing. Numerous attempts were made to revive it during the 1990s and 2000s, most notably as a Major League Soccer (MLS) club. Seeking to retain the Cosmos' heritage, Pinton refused to sell the name and image rights, believing that MLS would not honor them. Following a change of attitude by MLS towards the NASL's legacy and the revival of several former NASL names, Pinton sold the rights to an international, English-based consortium in August 2009. A new Cosmos team started playing in the second-tier North American Soccer League during the fall 2013 season, and following the league's folding in 2017, in the third-tier National Independent Soccer Association, but have been on hiatus since 2021.

History

Creation and naming

The club was founded in December 1970 by Ahmet and Nesuhi Ertegun, renowned executives at Atlantic Records, whose parent company Warner Communications acquired the Cosmos in April 1972. The team's first recruit was the Englishman Clive Toye, a former sportswriter who had moved to the United States in 1967 to become general manager of the short-lived Baltimore Bays; he was given the same post in New York. Toye sought to convey the new team's ambitions within its name, and reasoned that he could outdo the "Metropolitans" label referenced by the then-nine-year-old New York Mets baseball team by calling his team the "Cosmos", shortened from "Cosmopolitans". However, the owners preferred other possible names: the Erteguns wished to use the name originally suggested by Nesuhi, the "New York Blues"; and another part of the ownership group wanted to adopt the name "New York Lovers". Toye then staged a rigged "name the team" contest, receiving 3,000 entries and selecting one that just happened to match his pre-determined winner. Two NYC teachers, Meyer Diller and Al Capelli, from Martin Van Buren High School in Queens, entered the contest and submitted the name "Cosmos". The two physical education teachers had independently used Toye's method of deriving it from "cosmopolitan". The two men were awarded a trip to Europe as a prize. The team name was officially unveiled on February 4, 1971.

North American Soccer League
The New York Cosmos entered the 1968-founded North American Soccer League (NASL) in 1970 and made their field debut in the league's fourth season in 1971. The first roster signing of the club was Gordon Bradley, an English professional who had moved to North America in 1963 and played for the New York Generals in 1968. He was made player-coach, a position he would hold until 1975. Bradley's team finished second in its division in its first year, playing at Yankee Stadium, home of the New York Yankees baseball team and the New York Giants football team. Randy Horton, from Bermuda, was named the league's Rookie of the Year after scoring 16 goals and 37 points, the most by any New York player. In 1972, the team moved to Hofstra Stadium where they won their first league title with a 2–1 victory over the St. Louis Stars. Horton was the league's top scorer and Most Valuable Player, with 9 goals and 22 points from the 14 regular-season games and two post-season matches. The Cosmos reached the play-offs once more in 1973, but were knocked out at the semi-final stage. Bradley coached the United States national team for six games during 1973—picking himself in one, despite not being an American citizen—but lost them all. Before the 1974 season, the Cosmos moved again, settling at Downing Stadium on Randall's Island. In their first year at their new base, they finished bottom of their division. Horton top scored for the Cosmos in every season before he was traded in 1975 to the Washington Diplomats.

Arrival of Pelé, and the Cosmos' peak
It was during the 1975 season that the Cosmos acquired the Brazilian star Pelé, whom they had been attempting to sign since the team was created. Ross had apparently not heard of him before getting involved in soccer, but agreed to finance the transfer when Toye compared the Brazilian's popularity to that of the Pope. Pelé joined the Cosmos on June 10, 1975, on a salary of $1.4 million per year, an enormous wage for an athlete at that time. A number of contracts—only one of which mentioned soccer—were set up for Pelé to ensure that he paid the lowest amount of tax possible, including one as a "recording artist" with Warner subsidiary Atlantic Records. "We owned him lock, stock and barrel," Toye retrospectively boasted. They also signed Mike Dillon in 1975.

The Pelé deal was later described by Gavin Newsham, an English writer, as "the transfer coup of the century". His arrival turned the Cosmos from a motley crew of foreigners, semi-professionals and students into a huge commercial presence. The club's groundsman, on hearing that the Brazilian's début for New York was to be broadcast on CBS, spray-painted the pitch green to disguise how little grass was on it: the match, against the Dallas Tornado, was broadcast to 22 countries and covered by more than 300 journalists from all over the world.

Although New York finished third at season end, it was still too low a placing to reach the post-season. Bradley was replaced for the 1976 season by another Englishman, Ken Furphy, who paired Pelé up front with Italian international forward Giorgio Chinaglia, a new arrival from S.S. Lazio. He had been so popular at Lazio that when his move to New York was announced, supporters "threatened to throw themselves beneath the wheels of the plane". By contrast to most of the overseas stars bought by NASL teams, Chinaglia was signed in his prime. He played for the Cosmos for the rest of their history, scoring a record number of goals and points not only for the Cosmos, but for the entire league. He shared an unusual personal bond with the club's ultimate controller, Ross, and was therefore treated differently from the other players, including Pelé.

Crowds rose with the arrival of these and other European and South American international players, resulting in a move back to Yankee Stadium for the 1976 season. With numerous foreign stars arriving at the Cosmos, the team's competitive performance improved, as New York reached the play-offs at the end of the season, but lost in the divisional championship match to the Tampa Bay Rowdies. The Cosmos relocated again before the 1977 season, to the newly constructed Giants Stadium in New Jersey, and at the same time dropped the prefix "New York" and played simply as "the Cosmos", without a geographical name. The city name was restored in 1979.

Bradley returned as coach for the 1977 season in place of the dismissed Furphy, but was removed after half of the season to become the club's vice-president of player personnel. South African-born former Italy international Eddie Firmani took his place. Pelé played his last professional match on October 1, 1977, in front of a capacity crowd at Giants Stadium: in an exhibition match between New York and his former club Santos, Pelé appeared for both sides, playing one half for each. The Cosmos won the game 2–1. Pelé's compatriot, former Brazil captain Carlos Alberto was signed in 1977, at the same time as Franz Beckenbauer, who had captained the 1974 FIFA World Cup-winning West Germany national team. On the field, New York won three out of four championships, in 1977, 1978 and 1980. A playoff game against the Fort Lauderdale Strikers in 1977 drew a crowd of 77,691, a record for American club soccer. The team's average attendances, regularly over 40,000 during the late 1970s, were the biggest in the league; this helped it to become regarded as the league's "marquee club", both commercially and competitively. Firmani was fired in 1979; he claimed, after falling out with Chinaglia. His assistant, Ray Klivecka, replaced him, becoming the team's first American-born coach. He lasted a season before himself being replaced by Júlio Mazzei.

On Pelé's farewell tour in 1977, the Cosmos made history by becoming the first Western professional soccer team to play in China. They drew their opening match with the Chinese national team 1-1, and lost the second game 2-1 despite Pelé scoring a free kick.

Decline of the Cosmos and the NASL

After the retirement of Pelé in 1977, much of the progress that American soccer had made during his stay was lost; there was no star at the same level to replace him as the NASL's headline act. After enduring briefly during the late 1970s, attendances dropped after 1980. The sport's popularity fell and the media lost interest. The deal with broadcaster ABC to broadcast NASL matches was also lost in 1980, and the 1981 Soccer Bowl was only shown on tape delay. All of the franchises quickly became unprofitable, and a salary cap enforced before the 1984 season only delayed the inevitable. The league folded at the end of 1984, following the loss of most of its franchises.

The Cosmos had financial problems of their own, on top of those affecting the league in general. Much of the Cosmos' ability to attract the well-known overseas players it had acquired was due to the financial resources of parent company Warner Communications. In the early 1980s, Warner was the target of a hostile takeover bid by Australian media magnate Rupert Murdoch; although this attempt did not succeed, Warner sold off several of its assets, among them Atari and Global Soccer, Inc., the subsidiary that operated the Cosmos. Chinaglia bought Global Soccer, and thus controlled the team. His group did not have the capital necessary to keep all of the players signed on expensive contracts by Warner, which resulted in many of the stars being sold. The club won its last title in 1982, and by the last season of the NASL, 1984, had missed the play-offs for the first time since 1975. The precipitous decline of the Cosmos after the 1983 season became for many fans and the media proof positive of the grave condition of the whole NASL.

Major Indoor Soccer League, demise and youth soccer
Following the collapse of the NASL, the team competed in the Major Indoor Soccer League during the 1984–85 season, with Klivecka briefly returning as coach, but withdrew after 33 games due to low attendance. Although the organization did not field a team following that season except for an aborted independent schedule in 1985 the Cosmos' youth soccer camps, which the team had started in 1977, remained in operation. The camps were run by former Cosmos general manager G. Peppe Pinton, who retained ownership of the Cosmos name, logo and records. Pinton continued the youth programs at Ramapo College in Mahwah, New Jersey. Summer camps program existed since 1978 after one year Pelé's retirement. Then Pinton took over with the Cosmos camps and became team's coach from 1989 to 2003, replacing Ken Medaska and Peter Valente.

New Cosmos team

Since the original New York Cosmos club stopped competing in 1985, there had been attempts to revive it. With the rise of Major League Soccer (MLS), various New York area entities—including two different ownership groups from the Metrostars/New York Red Bulls—lobbied Pinton for the acquisition of the Cosmos name. Pinton refused to sell to an MLS team, believing that the league would not acknowledge the Cosmos' legacy. However, when old NASL names such as the San Jose Earthquakes, Seattle Sounders, Portland Timbers and Vancouver Whitecaps were revived as MLS franchises, he reconsidered. He sold the Cosmos name and brand to English businessman Paul Kemsley in 2009, whose group announced a new team with the Cosmos' name in August 2010. The new Cosmos initially intended to become an MLS expansion franchise, but ultimately turned down the invitation to apply. Kemsley's team instead joined the new second-tier incarnation of the North American Soccer League, starting play in its 2013 Fall season.

Cultural impact and influence on U.S. soccer

When Pelé arrived at the Cosmos in 1975, American soccer was, in Newsham's phrase, "dying a slow, painful and largely unnoticed death". The sport was not taken seriously by the bulk of the American media, and was of little interest to the public. Matches were often played in front of almost-empty stands, receiving modest press coverage. The signing of Pelé by the Cosmos transformed soccer across the country almost immediately, lending credibility not only to the Cosmos, but also to the NASL and soccer in general. Within days of the Brazilian's arrival, the increased media attention had caused the Cosmos' office staff to increase from five people to more than 50. Soccer became seen as a viable alternative to more traditional "American" sports such as basketball, baseball and American football. The Cosmos, in particular, became an internationally famous club – "the most glamorous team in world football", in Newsham's words, or "soccer demigods" in those of ESPN writer David Hirshey.

The Cosmos, as the flagship team of the NASL, embodied what Hirshey labeled the "nexus of soccer and showbiz", and became Warner Communications' most culturally visible asset. After Pelé signed for New York, many other European and South American stars joined NASL teams; the Los Angeles Aztecs, for example, signed George Best and Johan Cruyff in 1976 and 1979 respectively. Cosmos road trips, described by traveling secretary Steve Marshall as "like traveling with the Rolling Stones", saw the team pack out each stadium it visited, while at home, the team attracted numerous high-profile supporters. While soccer had previously been largely ignored by the American press, the Cosmos and other NASL teams now became regular fixtures on the back pages.

However, just as Pelé had kick-started the development of soccer in the U.S., his retirement in 1977 would mark the start of a decline. With nobody of the same stature to personify the sport, the popularity that had been built up nosedived just as quickly as it had appeared. The league's television deal with ABC was lost at the end of 1980 and a salary cap, enforced before the 1984 season, caused many of the remaining overseas stars—lured to America by fat pay packets—to return to the European and South American leagues. The NASL collapsed abruptly in late 1984, and was not replaced by a new professional soccer league until Major League Soccer's first season in 1996.

A feature-length documentary about the Cosmos, called Once in a Lifetime: The Extraordinary Story of the New York Cosmos, was released in theaters in 2006. The film, narrated by Matt Dillon, featured interviews with many of the players and personalities involved with the team.

Uniforms and crest
For the team's initial uniform Cosmos general manager Clive Toye chose the green and yellow of the Brazil national team as part of his strategy to lure Pelé, one of that country's star players, to the United States. The club's initial uniform was all green with yellow trim, with the colors reversed on the road uniform. Coincidentally, the colors were the same as those of the previous New York NASL team, the New York Generals, which had folded after the 1968 season. When Pelé did come on board in 1975, the uniform was changed to all-white in imitation of his club in Brazil, Santos FC. The green and yellow elements were relegated to the trim. The green shirt was concurrently matched with white shorts to become the new away uniform. Uniforms designed by Ralph Lauren were used from 1979 to the end; the home uniform remained all-white, though with navy and yellow trim replacing the green and white trim of the previous outfit. The away uniform became navy shirts and shorts with yellow trim, paired with unusual yellow-and-navy hooped socks, which were later replaced with plain navy blue ones.

The artist commissioned by Toye to design the team's logo was Wayland Moore, a sports artist from Atlanta who had already worked on the logo, uniform and program covers of that city's soccer team, the Chiefs. Moore attempted to create a design that was simple, recognizable and inclusive of New York's many nationalities. The three colored "blades" surrounding the soccer ball in the center represent movement, while the font originally used was chosen simply because it was easily legible on the uniform. The text on the logo was shortened to "Cosmos" in 1977, concurrently with the team's dropping of the "New York" label. The city name was restored two years later, but the badge remained unchanged.

Uniform evolution

Uniform suppliers
Uniform suppliers used by the team:

Theme song

Ahmet Ertegun used his connections to recruit Atlantic Records artists the Average White Band to create a theme song for the Cosmos. The resulting "The Cosmos Theme" was written by band members Alan Gorrie and Steve Ferrone, and recorded by the band under the pseudonym "The Cosmic Highlanders".

Team management originally wanted to use "We Are the Champions" by Queen as the club's theme, but were convinced to use The Cosmos Theme in part by the cheerleaders, who enjoyed dancing to it.

The Cosmos Theme was played extensively at Giants Stadium, and on television broadcasts of Cosmos games.

Stadiums

The Cosmos' first home stadium was Yankee Stadium, home to both the New York Yankees baseball team and the New York Giants football team, where they played throughout the 1971 season. Attendances during the club's first year averaged at 4,517, less than 7% of the stadium's capacity, which was at that time 65,010. After two seasons of continuing low crowds at this out-of-town location, the Cosmos moved again, relocating to the 22,500-capacity Downing Stadium before the 1974 season. It was at Downing Stadium that attendances started to rise significantly, buoyed by the arrival of stars such as Pelé, who arrived in 1975. For the Brazilian's first match, the stadium was full; "there must have been another 50,000 turned away", coach Gordon Bradley later claimed.

These larger attendances necessitated another move, which occurred in 1976, when the Cosmos returned to Yankee Stadium. This time the team averaged 18,227 fans over the course of the season, over four times the average 1971 gate. The team then moved yet again before the 1977 season, to the newly built Giants Stadium, where attendances skyrocketed; crowds peaked at an average of 47,856 during 1978. The Cosmos remained at Giants Stadium for the rest of their time in the NASL. Attendances gradually fell as the league declined during the early 1980s, then finally slumped in 1984, when they dropped by more than half from the 1983 seasonal average.

The largest crowd to attend a Cosmos home game was set in 1977, when the Fort Lauderdale Strikers visited for a playoff match. The game was attended by 77,691 fans, which, at the time, was a record for American soccer. The lowest average attendance for a season was 3,578, in 1974. As of 2011, only Hofstra Stadium remains, now renamed James M. Shuart Stadium. Downing Stadium, the original Yankee Stadium and Giants Stadium were demolished in 2002, 2008 and 2010 respectively.

While playing indoor soccer, the Cosmos' home arenas were the Brendan Byrne Arena (now the Meadowlands Arena) and Madison Square Garden.

Supporters
The Cosmos sought to maximize their fanbase by appealing to as wide a demographic as possible. The club's name and badge were designed to be inclusive of New York's many immigrant communities; the logo purposefully avoided the standard American red, white and blue. In this the Cosmos succeeded, attracting noticeable support from local Europeans, Middle-Easterners and South Americans. The association of the team with the city's high society in both social and sporting contexts led to it becoming very popular among celebrities, both American and international. "We transcended everything, every culture, every socio-economic boundary," goalkeeper Shep Messing said in 2006. "We were international, we were European, we were cool, we were Americans from the Bronx. We were everything to everybody."

Players

The New York Cosmos are famous for having fielded numerous well-known players, almost all of whom were from outside the United States: examples include Pelé, Franz Beckenbauer and Carlos Alberto. American players of note include goalkeeper Shep Messing – who was notoriously sold after posing nude for a magazine in December 1974, then brought back two years later on Pelé's insistence. The Cosmos also fielded Werner Roth, a Yugoslavian-born U.S. international defender, from 1972 to 1979. A number of Cosmos players were named in the NASL all-star teams selected by the league at the end of each season. No NASL all-star from the Cosmos was born in the United States or Canada, where all of the league's teams were based; apart from Roth, both North Americans selected—Siegfried Stritzl and John Kerr—were born in Yugoslavia and Scotland respectively.

Retired numbers

10 –  Pelé (Forward, 1975–77)

Head coaches
The New York Cosmos' first head coach was the English-American professional Gordon Bradley, who had played in the English Football League's lower divisions during the 1950s before moving to America in 1963. Bradley came out of retirement to become player-coach, a role he retained until his departure in 1975. Bradley's team won the league championship in 1972, but after it failed to reach the playoffs in both 1974 and 1975, he was dismissed. His replacement was another Englishman, Ken Furphy. His Cosmos succeeded in reaching the post-season, but lost the divisional championship game to Vancouver, prompting Furphy's own departure in favor of a return for Bradley, whose second spell lasted only half a season before he was promoted to an advisory role. Eddie Firmani, the South African-born former Italy forward, took over midway through the 1977 season. His star-studded team won two consecutive Soccer Bowls—1977 and 1978—but lost the National Conference championship game in 1979. Firmani lost his job after falling out with Giorgio Chinaglia, a favorite of the Cosmos hierarchy. His assistant, Ray Klivecka, who was born in Lithuania, became the team's first American head coach when he took Firmani's place midway through 1979.

Klivecka was replaced before the 1980 season by Brazilian coach Júlio Mazzei, who won the Cosmos' fourth title at the end of that campaign before being succeeded by two joint head coaches, Hennes Weisweiler & Yasin Özdenak, in 1980. This duo's team came second in the 1981 NASL before Mazzei returned in 1982 and won his second championship with the Cosmos during that year. Firmani returned in 1984, the NASL's final year, in which the Cosmos failed to make the playoffs. Firmani remained as the team entered the Major Indoor Soccer League for the 1984–85 season, but was fired in early December, halfway through the season, and replaced by Klivecka, who returned after two games under the caretaker management of goalkeeper Hubert Birkenmeier. Klivecka was retained until the team ceased competitive play.

Honors

With five championships and seven first-place finishes, the Cosmos still rank as tied for the most successful franchise in the history of North American soccer.

Friendly matches and world tour
New York Cosmos had many friendly matches in domestic and abroad.

See also

 Soccer in New York City

References

External links

 
Once in a Lifetime – The Extraordinary Story of the New York Cosmos

 
Association football clubs established in 1971
Association football clubs disestablished in 1985
Defunct soccer clubs in New York (state)
Men's soccer clubs in New York (state)
North American Soccer League (1968–1984) teams
Defunct indoor soccer clubs in the United States
1971 establishments in New York City
1985 disestablishments in New York (state)
Soccer clubs in New York City